Chelodes is a genus of Palaeozoic molluscs made up of serially repeated monoplacophoran-like valves.

Synonyms: Eochelodes, Praecanthochiton Bergenhayn 1960, Preacanthochiton Bergenhayn 1960

References 

Prehistoric chiton genera
Ordovician first appearances
Silurian extinctions